Potkraj may refer to the following places in Bosnia and Herzegovina:

Potkraj, Breza, a village in the municipality of Brezi
Potkraj, Donji Vakuf, a village in the municipality of Donjem Vakuf
Potkraj, Kiseljak, a village in the municipality of Kiseljak
Potkraj, Livno, a village in the municipality of Livno
Potkraj, Široki Brijeg, a village in the municipality of Širokom Brijeg

See also
Podkraj (disambiguation)